Sutuphaa was the king of Ahom kingdom from 1369 CE to 1376 CE after an interregnum, though historians differ regarding his year of accession, as some of them claim his year of accession was 1364. His reign was marked by conflicts with Chutia Kingdom, which later resulted in his treacherous murder, by the Chutias.

Ancestry and accession
Sutuphaa was the second son of Ahom king Sukhaangphaa. After the death of his father, his elder brother Sukhrangpha ascended the throne. After a reign of thirty-two years, Sukhrangpha died in 1364 CE. Historians differ from this point. While accounts of early historians stated that after the death of Sukhrangpha, his brother Sutuphaa directly ascended the throne in 1364 CE. But modern historians, Padmeswar Gogoi and S. L. Baruah stated that there was a period of interregnum after the death of Sukhrangpha, from 1364 CE and 1369 CE, thereby placing the year of Sutuphaa’s accession in 1369 CE.

Reign and assassination
Sutuphaa wanted to expand the territory of Ahom kingdom. This led to frequent conflicts with neighbouring Chutiya kingdom. In 1376 CE, the Chutiya King visited Sutuphaa at Chapaguri, and, pretending to be reconciled, invited him to a regatta on the Safrai river. The Chutiya king enticed Sutuphaa on to his own barge without attendants, and there the Chutiyas treacherously murdered Sutuphaa. The Ahom soldiers accompanying Sutuphaa returned to the capital, bearing news of the unfortunate incident. A king assassinated in another kingdom would have immediately started a battle which evidently didn't take place. Moreover, nothing is mentioned about the forces which escorted the Ahom king who would have immediately taken necessary steps to protect their king or even launch a counter attack.

Interregnum
After Sutuphaa's death, there was no prince whom the Ahom nobles thought worthy of the throne, and so, for four years (1376–1380 CE), Chao Phrongdam Burhagohain and Taphrikhin Borgohain carried on the administration themselves. In 1380 CE, finding it difficult to govern the country without a king, the nobles raised Sutuphaa's younger brother Tyao Khamti, the third son of Sukhaangphaa, to the throne.

Notes

References
 
 
 

Ahom kings
14th century in India
Ahom kingdom
14th-century Tai people

1370s deaths
Year of birth unknown
Year of death uncertain